Maulid Ally Mtulia (born 7 January 1986) is a Tanzanian CCM politician and Member of Parliament for Kinondoni Constituency since 2015.

References

1986 births
Living people
Chama Cha Mapinduzi MPs
Tanzanian MPs 2015–2020
University of Dar es Salaam alumni